Robert Leszek Moczulski (born 7 June 1930) is a Polish historian and politician, a member of various organizations, first supporting then supposedly opposing the communist regime in the People's Republic of Poland while dividing the opposition movement.

Leszek Moczulski was born on 7 June 1930 in Warsaw. Shortly after the war and the Communist take-over of power in Poland, Moczulski became involved in various communist organizations. In 1947 he became a member of the Association of Fighting Youth and the following year he became the member of the Polish Workers' Party and the ZMP youth organization. Then since 1950 young Moczulski was a member of the Polish United Workers' Party (PUWP).

In 1951 he graduated from the Academy of Political Studies, a school of cadres for the communist regime. The following year he graduated also from the faculties of Law and Journalism at the Warsaw University. He completed his education in 1958 by graduating from the faculty of history at the same university. About that time he started to work as a journalist for various Warsaw-based newspapers and weeklies, among them the Życie Warszawy, Dookoła Świata and Stolica weekly. As a historian, Moczulski focused mostly on modern history of Poland, including the history of the Polish Defensive War.

Initially, according to the Polish lustration court, a secret informer of the Służba Bezpieczeństwa secret political police, in late 1970s Moczulski most probably broke up (or just the opposite) with the regime and started working for various anti-communist associations. He was one of the inspirers of the creation and the spokesperson of the Movement for Defense of Human and Civic Rights. Conflicted with the rest of the members, he tried to break it up by forming a ZINO faction, which was however unsuccessful. Finally, on 1 September 1979 Moczulski announced the creation of the Confederation of Independent Poland.

As a politician, Moczulski referred to the rightist wing of the pre-war Sanacja and the supporters of Józef Piłsudski. In his political works he focused mostly on economical aspect of the possible transformation of Communist planned economy into free market economy. Among the most notable of his actions of the 1980s was a memorandum of February 1985, in which he urged the governments of United Kingdom and the United States to fulfill the promises of the Yalta Conference of 1945 and organise free elections in Poland. For such actions, Moczulski was arrested several times and held in prisons as a political prisoner.

After the Round Table Talks and the peaceful transfer of power from the communist regime to the democratic authorities, Moczulski distanced himself from the agreement and openly criticised the idea of gruba kreska, instead supporting an idea of decommunization, a concept coined after the post-World War II de-nazification of Nazi Germany. He also stayed off the Solidarity movement. He failed to gain enough support in the Kraków-Podgórze constituency for his candidacy to the Sejm in the Contract elections of 1989. The following year he took part in the presidential elections scoring 2.50% of votes. In the Polish parliamentary elections of 1991 he became a member of the parliament. He held his post in the elections of 1993. During his membership, he was a president of various commissions, including the commissions responsible for foreign policies, for support of Polonia, as well as the commission working on the project of the new constitution.

Moczulski also took part in the presidential election of 1995, though he withdrew his candidacy. In 1992, during the last days of the government of Jan Olszewski, Moczulski was accused by Antoni Macierewicz of being one of the secret agents of the Służba Bezpieczeństwa (SB), a communist secret police. In 1997, after the Lustration Act took place, Moczulski himself asked the lustration tribunal to investigate the matter. However, contrary to his official stance, he was found guilty of hiding his collaboration with the SB during the period 1969-1977, which ended his political career.

Note 
  According to the Polish Lustration Act, all candidates to the Sejm, Senate or government are to announce whether they collaborated with secret services of the communist regime of Poland. The declaration is then printed on all official lists of candidates.

References

1930 births
Living people
Writers from Warsaw
20th-century Polish historians
Polish male non-fiction writers
Members of the Polish Sejm 1991–1993
Members of the Polish Sejm 1993–1997
Candidates in the 1990 Polish presidential election
University of Warsaw alumni